Felicia westae is a sparsely branched shrub growing up to  tall, that is assigned to the family Asteraceae. The lower parts of the stems have lost their leaves and the upper part has many crowded, upwardly angled and curved, alternate leaves pressed against the stem, with the edges curled inward. The flower heads form at the tips of the branches, each about 3 cm (1 in) across, with about twenty purplish blue ray florets surrounding many yellow disc florets. It is only known from a small area in the Eastern Cape province of South Africa.

Description 
The lower parts of the stem are largely hairless, the higher parts are crowded with arched upturned leaves.

In the center of each corolla are five anthers merged into a tube, through which the style grows when the floret opens, hoovering up the pollen on its shaft. At the tip of both style branches is a narrowly triangular appendage. The cypselae of the ray florets are hairless, those of the disc florets short-haired.

Taxonomy 
This species of Felicia was first described by Henry Georges Fourcade in 1932, based on a specimen he collected in 1928. He named it Aster westae.  Jürke Grau in his 1973 Revision of the genus Felicia (Asteraceae), reassigned the species and made the combination Felicia westae. The species is considered to be part of the section Anhebecarpaea.

Distribution, habitat and conservation 
Felicia westae was known from many observations near Humansdorp in the southwest of the Eastern Cape province of South Africa, where it occurred on river banks in low-lying areas near the coast. It grows in vegetation types called Tsitsikamma Sandstone Fynbos and Garden Route Shale Fynbos. It is considered to be endangered because its habitat suffered from expanding agriculture and timber plantations, while on the riverbanks it is out-competed by invasive plant species. After 1944 it was no longer found until it was rediscovered in 2015 along a few tributaries of the Tsitsikamma River.

References

External links 
 Line drawing of Felicia westae
 Distribution of Felicia westae

westae
Endemic flora of South Africa
Plants described in 1932